Rafael Manzano may refer to:

 Rafael Manzano Martos (born 1936), Spanish architect
 Rafael Manzano (swimmer) (born 1975), Venezuelan swimmer